Ramón Blanco (born 6 February 1926) is a Spanish alpine skier. He competed in the men's slalom at the 1948 Winter Olympics.

References

1926 births
Living people
Spanish male alpine skiers
Olympic alpine skiers of Spain
Alpine skiers at the 1948 Winter Olympics
Sportspeople from Madrid